Elsa Grave (17 January 1918 – 17 June 2003) was a Swedish novelist, poet and artist.

Biography
Born in 1918, Grave's father, Carl Wolrath Grave, was a mining engineer and her mother, Elsa Regina Järle, a teacher. The family first lived in Gunnarstorp in Scania, moved to Billesholm in 1929 and to Nyvång near Åstorp in 1932. In 1938, Grave studied art in Paris and at Isaac Grünewald's school in Stockholm. In 1942, she graduated in Romance languages and history of art from Lund University.

In 1943, she established herself as an early modernist with her collection Inkräktare (Intruders). Grave developed her own special symbolic style in poems often critical of Western civilization. She gained fame in 1948 when she published her third collection, Bortförklaring (Excuse) in 1948, with the poem Svinborstnatt (Hog's Bristle Night) depicting pigs in a sty which achieve almost human characteristics. A topic she frequently addresses is motherhood, evoking an angry, sorrowful mother painfully performing her tasks, as in Den blåa himlen (The Blue Sky, 1949), especially in the poem Djuphausmakerad (Deep Sea Masquerade).  By 1989, when she published Sataneller, many critics had had enough of her cruel litanies, full of anger and despondency.

Grave also wrote a novel, Ariel, in 1955 in which the narrator, Marina, seeks freedom from conventional women's roles. Her play Fläsksabbat (Bacon Sabbath), published in Tre lyriska gräl (1962), is a devastating criticism of Western materialism conveyed by presenting the gluttonous behaviour of a family at Christmastime.

Works

References

Further reading

External links
Elsa Grave Sällskabet (Elsa Grave Society) in Swedish

1918 births
2003 deaths
Swedish women poets
Swedish women novelists
Swedish women artists
20th-century Swedish poets
20th-century Swedish novelists
Modernist poets
Modernist women writers
20th-century Swedish women writers